Kinnaird ("high headland") is a village in Gowrie, Perthshire, Scotland.

It is notable for its 15th-century castle. The four-storeyed Kinnaird Castle was a stronghold of the Threiplands of Fingask, a local Jacobite family. The castle was restored heavily by then owner Stuart Stout in the 1960s, and was later the venue for his 1988 wedding to Audrey Gregory, who reportedly became "known as the Lady of Kinnaird".
 
The area is also home to an early-19th-century parish church. In the 18th century, it was the home of the Reverend James Adams, who contributed to the Marrow Controversy in the church of Scotland.

The Carse of Gowrie, in which the village is located, is an agricultural district of Perthshire.

Notable people

Robert Carnegie, Lord Kinnaird (c. 1490–1566), born in the castle
James Mylne (1757–1839), philosopher

References

 geo.ed.ac.uk

Villages in Perth and Kinross